Trifolium rubens is a species of flowering plant belonging to the family Fabaceae.

Its native range is Central and Southern Europe to Ukraine.

References

rubens